Cecilia Aguiar-Curry (born September 25, 1954) is an American politician serving in the California State Assembly. She is a Democrat representing the 4th Assembly District, encompassing Wine Country and the western parts of the Sacramento Valley.

Biography 
Cecilia grew up in western Yolo County. She went to San Jose State University and earned her degree in business administration. After going to school and working in the Bay Area for several years, she moved back to her hometown of Winters. She is a co-owner of her family's walnut farm in Yolo County. Prior to her election to the Assembly, she was the first female Mayor of Winters.

2016 California State Assembly

2018 California State Assembly

2020 California State Assembly

References

External links 

 
 Campaign website

Democratic Party members of the California State Assembly
Living people
People from Winters, California
Mayors of places in California
21st-century American politicians
San Jose State University alumni
1954 births
Women mayors of places in California
Women state legislators in California
21st-century American women politicians